is a Japanese voice actress from Mie Prefecture, Japan, affiliated with Horipro.

Career 
Since her childhood, she played with her father watching anime and mimicking acting. She learned from her parents that there is a job as a voice actor, and when she was in elementary school, she vaguely aimed to be a voice actress. Then, she applied for the Jisedai Miracle Seiyū Audition (次世代声優ミラクルオーディション, Next Generation Voice Actor Miracle Audition) in 2017, won the Grand Prix award, and made her voice acting debut as Aine Yūki, the main character in the TV animation Aikatsu Friends!. Matsunaga went to Tokyo for her debut and worked on voice performance for the first time on the post-recording scene. As a member of the derivative unit BEST FRIENDS! in the popular vote for female voice actor starring in the 2018 spring broadcast anime performed at Kakaku.com's news site "Akiba Research Institute", the debut work Aikatsu Friends! and was ranked 46th out of 56.

Filmography

Anime

Video Games

Dubbing

References

Bibliography

External links
 Official agency profile 
 
 
  *Note her name is spelled differently and has a role that is likely a different person with the same name*

2001 births
Living people
Horipro artists
Japanese video game actresses
Japanese voice actresses
Voice actresses from Mie Prefecture